Family Tree is a boxed set of musical material by Icelandic singer Björk. The set consists of a book of lyrics entitled "Words", five 3-inch compact discs of rare and previously unreleased material, and a regular-sized compact disc of "Greatest Hits" selected by Björk herself. Family Tree was released in November 2002, concurrent with the release of Björk's Greatest Hits album, in which the tracks were selected by her fans.

Information
The five 3-inch compact discs include: "Roots CD 1", which features songs recorded before Björk's "second solo debut" (i.e. previous to her 1993 album Debut). This compact disc features songs by her previous bands: Kukl, the Elgar Sisters, and the Sugarcubes. "Roots CD 2" features b-sides and alternate versions of album tracks; "Beats", which focuses on both new and old songs with a heavier electronica influence; and finally "Strings", CDs 1 and 2, which feature live and studio recordings of Björk with the Brodsky Quartet through 1999 and 2000.

The artwork on the CD was designed by M/M Paris in collaboration with Icelandic contemporary artist Gabríela Friðriksdóttir. The cover consists of a tree with letter on the upper part.

A music video for the song Nature is Ancient, directed by Lynn Fox, was released in November 2002 to promote the compilation, even though the song was originally released in 1997. Originally, it was a B-side to the "Bachelorette" single, but it was later included on Family Tree. The video was also released on the compilation Greatest Hits - Volumen 1993–2003.

Björk's notes for the project, as featured on the individual CD artworks, reveal that "Immature" and "My Spine" were initially considered to feature on the compilation, as well as track(s) recorded with British composer John Tavener.

Track listing

Notes
"Mother Heroic" contains lyrics taken from the poem "Belgium" by E. E. Cummings.

Charts

References

External links
Family Tree mini site
Björk official website

Björk albums
B-side compilation albums
2002 compilation albums
One Little Independent Records compilation albums
Albums produced by Björk